Thingsen is a village in the Saiha district of Mizoram, India.

References

Villages in Saiha district